Cottari Kanakaiya Nayudu  (31 October 1895 – 14 November 1967), also known as CK, was the first captain of the Indian cricket team in Test matches.
 He played first-class cricket regularly until 1958, and returned for one last time in 1963 at the age of 68. In 1923, the ruler of Holkar invited him to Indore and made him a captain in his army, conferring on him the honour of a Colonel in Holkar's Army.

Arthur Gilligan led the first MCC tour to India in the 1926–27 season. For the Hindus at Bombay Gymkhana, Nayudu hit 153 in 116 minutes with 11 sixes. One of the sixes, off Bob Wyatt, landed on the roof of the Gymkhana. The MCC presented him with a silver bat in recognition of that innings. He was also the first Indian cricketer to endorse a brand (Bathgate Liver Tonic) in 1941. The Government of India awarded him the third highest (then second highest) civilian honour of Padma Bhushan in 1956.

Birth
Nayudu was born on 31 October 1895 in Bara Bada Nagpur to Cottari Surya Prakash Rao Nayudu, son of Rao Bahadur Cottari Narayana Swamy Nayudu, a rich Kapu (caste) Naidu person from Machilipatnam, Andhra Pradesh, a lawyer and landlord owning several villages and sizable chunk in Nagpur. Besides being a flourishing lawyer, he was a pioneer member of All India National Congress party. C. K. Nayudu's younger brother C. S. Nayudu also played test cricket for India.

Family 

Narayana Swamy was affluent enough to send both his sons to England for further studies. His elder son, Cottari Vekatramana Nayudu, was married to the daughter of Raja Prabhakar Moorthy of Eluru and had one son by the name of Cottari Ranga Rao Nayudu who was also an advocate from England. The younger son, Cottari Surya Prakash Rao Nayudu, had four sons and two daughters, did his B.A. and M.A at Downing College, Cambridge University and was called to the Middle Temple Bar in 1891. He was acclaimed for his physical prowess and known as Hercules in Cambridge varsity campus. He was Justice in High Court of Holkar State for some years and functioned as Chief Justice for some time. Maharaja Shivaji Rao Holkar was ruler in those days. The Maharajah had put on record that he had faith in only two persons- Surya Prakash Rao being the first and K.S. Ranjitsinhji of Nawanagar, who played for Sussex and England and was contemporary of C. Surya Prakash Rao Nayudu while at Cambridge.

Nayudu had nine children from his two marriages, seven girls and two sons, namely C Narayana Swami Nayudu and Prakash Nayudu, who was an Indian athlete and Indian police services officer. His daughter, Chandra Nayudu, was India's first female cricket commentator.

Cricket career 

Nayudu was drafted in the school team at the age of seven, and showed promise for a bright future. He made his first class debut in 1916 in the Bombay Triangular. For the Hindus against the Europeans, he came in to bat at No.9 with his team tottering at 79 for 7.He made his last appearance in the Ranji Trophy in 1956–57, aged 62, scoring 52 in his last innings for Uttar Pradesh. Earlier in the season he had made 84 against Rajasthan, striking Vinoo Mankad for two sixes. That innings of 84 made Nayudu a record-breaker as the oldest player to score his age or more in a first class cricket match.  His final outing was in a charity match in 1963–64, when he played for the Maharashtra Governor's XI against the Maharashtra Chief Minister's XI.

Death
Nayudu died in 1967 in Indore at the age of 72.

Legacy
 In 2006, the BCCI instituted an award named the 'Col CK Nayudu Lifetime Achievement Award', which is given to individuals for their unparalleled contribution to Indian cricket. The award carries a trophy, citation and cash award.
 CK Nayudu Trophy, India's under-25 domestic tournament is named after him.
 There is a statue of him in his hometown Machilipatnam, which was inaugurated by former Indian team captain Anil Kumble.
 On 1 March 2023, his statue was unveiled at the Holkar Stadium in Indore. The stadium hosted the third test of the Border–Gavaskar Trophy. The statue was unveiled by the two captains - Rohit Sharma and Steve Smith.

References

Further reading
Eskari, C.K. Nayudu: A Cricketer of Charm, Calcutta: Illustrated News, 1945.
A.F.S. Talyarkhan, ‘C.K. Nayudu As We Knew Him’, in On with the Game, Bombay: Hind Kitabs, 1945.
Gerald Howat, Captains galore—India's first official Test match, at Lord's in 1932, The Cricketer, July 2002
Vasant Raiji, C.K. Nayudu: the Shahenshah of Indian Cricket, Mumbai: Marine Sports, 1989.
Mihir Bose, A History of Indian Cricket, London: Andre Deutsch, 1990.
L.N. Mathur, C.K. Nayudu – Legend in His Life Time, Udaipur: Shiva Publishers, 1996.
Ramachandra Guha, ‘The First Great Indian Cricketer: C. K. Nayudu’, in An Anthropologist among the Marxists and Other Essays, Delhi: Permanent Black, 2001.
Souvik Naha, ‘Producing the First Indian Cricketing Superhero: Nationalism, Body Culture, Consumption and the C.K. Nayudu Phenomenon', International Journal of the History of Sport volume 29, no. 4, 2012, 
Aditya Bhushan, A Colonel Destined to Lead, Mumbai, Story Mirror, 2017

External links

 

1895 births
1967 deaths
Hyderabad cricketers
India Test cricket captains
India Test cricketers
Indian cricketers
Recipients of the Padma Bhushan in sports
Telugu people
People from Machilipatnam
People from Krishna district
Cricketers from Nagpur
Cricketers from Indore
Wisden Cricketers of the Year
Tamil Nadu cricketers
Hindus cricketers
Central India cricketers
Holkar cricketers
Uttar Pradesh cricketers
East Zone cricketers
Central Zone cricketers
Andhra cricketers
Roshanara Club cricketers